The Danish straits are the straits connecting the Baltic Sea to the North Sea through the Kattegat and Skagerrak. Historically, the Danish straits were internal waterways of Denmark; however, following territorial losses, Øresund and Fehmarn Belt are now shared with Sweden and Germany, while the Great Belt and the Little Belt have remained Danish territorial waters. The Copenhagen Convention of 1857 made all the Danish straits open to commercial shipping. The straits have generally been regarded as an international waterway.

Toponymy and geography
Five straits are named 'belt' (Danish: bælt), the only ones in the world. Several other straits are named 'sound' (Danish, Swedish and German: sund). Where an island is situated between a "belt" and a "sound", typically the broader strait is called "belt" and the narrower one is the "sound":

 Als: 
 separated from the continent by Alssund 
 separated from Fyn by the southern part of the Little Belt, an area referred to in German (but not Danish) as Alsenbelt
 Fehmarn
 separated from the continent by Fehmarnsund, also Femersund
 separated from Lolland by Fehmarnbelt (German) / Femerbelt (Platt) / Femernbælt (former spelling: Femer Bælt)

 Langeland: 
 separated from Tåsinge Island by Siø Sund (Tåsinge itself is separated from Fyn by Svendborg Sund)
 separated from Lolland by Langelandsbælt, the southern part of Great Belt
 Lolland: 
 separated from Falster Island by Guldborgsund (Falster itself is separated from Zealand by Storstrømmen Strait)
 separated from Langeland by Langelandsbælt
 separated from Fehmarn by Femernbælt, which is the common continuation of Great Belt–Langelandsbælt and Little Belt
 Zealand (Danish: Sjælland)
 separated from Scandinavian peninsula of the continent by Øresund (Danish) / Öresund (Swedish)
 separated from Fyn Island by the Great Belt

Etymology of "sound" / "sund"

The Germanic word "sound" has the same root as the verb to sunder in the meaning of "to separate". The Old Norse form of that verb is sundr. In Norway hundreds of narrow straits separating islands and combining fjords or outer parts of fjords are named "Sund".

Another explanation derives "sound" from an ancient verb "sund" in the meaning of to swim. That way a sound is a swimmable strait. In the Swedish language any strait is called "sund".

The Germanic word "sound" is not related to the Romance languages originated word "sound", which has developed from the Latin sonus.

See also
 Kiel Canal
 List of islands of Denmark
 March across the Belts

References 
 Denmark 1:500,000 – official map for download
 Norwegian dictionary: sund
 Norwegian dictionary: sundre

 
Baltic Sea
Kattegat
Bodies of water of the North Sea
International straits
Straits of Sweden
Straits of Germany
Straits of the Atlantic Ocean